Raiffeisen Bank International (RBI) is an Austrian banking group and a central institution of the Raiffeisen Banking Group Austria (RBG). The bank is listed on the Vienna Stock Exchange, with RBG's regional banks its major shareholders.

RBI was a subsidiary of Raiffeisen Zentralbank (RZB Group) until March 2017, when it reverse-merged with RZB into one unified company. Due to its size, the bank was supervised by the European Central Bank as one of the 126 banking groups.

History

Formerly a subsidiary of Raiffeisen Zentralbank, Raiffeisen Bank International operates a banking network mainly in Central and Eastern Europe, although also maintains operations in Western Europe. Seventeen markets are covered by subsidiary banks, leasing companies, and representative offices. At the end of 2010, RBI served over 14 million customers with about 3,000 branch offices. At the end of February 2010, RZB CEO Walter Rothensteiner announced that a possible merger of RZB with Raiffeisen International Bank-Holding AG (RI) was being considered. The move would provide broader access to the capital, money, and bond markets. Since the changes would take place within the group, it would have no impact on their equity capital ratios. The newly-founded Raiffeisen Bank International would contain RI and those segments of RZB which do not involve the Raiffeisen sector. Business related to RZB's function as the central institution of the Raiffeisen Banking Group and participation relevant to this sector would remain at RZB. On 19 April 2010, the executive boards of the two institutions resolved to present the proposed merger to the shareholders for approval. At the general shareholders' meeting on 7 July 2010, RZB's shareholders voted to merge the bank's commercial customer business with RI. The following day, RI shareholders approved the merger at a general shareholders' meeting. The new institution, Raiffeisen Bank International, began its activities on 11 October 2010.

In 2013, Raiffeisen Bank International opened its Hong Kong branch. Two years later, its Xiamen branch and Harbin office closed. In 2016, Raiffeisen Banka d.d. of Slovenia (which was renamed KBS Banka and merged with another bank to become Nova KBM) was sold to Apollo Global Management and the European Bank for Reconstruction and Development.

On 18 March 2017, Raiffeisen Bank International merged with Raiffeisen Zentralbank Österreich; the merger was approved at a January 2017 extraordinary general meeting of RBI's shareholders. The bank suspended the initial public offering of its subsidiary, Raiffeisen Bank Polska, in mid-2017.

Locations

 
 Europe
 Albania
 Belarus
 Bosnia and Herzegovina
 Croatia
 Czech Republic
 
 Kosovo
 Poland 
 Romania 
 Russia
 Serbia 
 Slovakia 
 Slovenia
 Ukraine
 Austria (includes Raiffeisen-Landesbank Tirol, Raiffeisenlandesbank Niederösterreich-Wien, Raiffeisenlandesbank Oberösterreich, etc.)
 Belgium (EU liaison office)
 France
 Germany
 Sweden
 United Kingdom
 Turkey (Raiffeisen Investment)

Asia:
 China
 India
 Singapore
 South Korea
 Vietnam
 Japan (in cooperation with Mizuho Bank)

 Americas
 United States

Former locations
 Europe
 Bulgaria (exited in 2022)

Belarus
By then, opposition Belarusian presidential candidates, demonstrators, and journalists had been arrested by the regime of Alexander Lukashenko amid mass protests. Pavel Latushko of the opposition Coordination Council accused RBI of supporting the dictatorship of Lukashenko, calling on RBI subsidiary Priorbank to end its business relationships with Belarusian state banks and to sell the government bonds. RBI rejected Latushko's charge that the bank economically supported human-rights violations in Belarus.

Bulgaria
In November 2021, Belgium-based KBC Bank and Raiffeisen Bank International reached an agreement for KBC to acquire 100% of the shares of Raiffeisenbank (Bulgaria) EAD, comprising RBI’s Bulgarian banking operations.  In March 2022, Bulgaria's competition regulator said that it gave the green light to KBC Bank, a unit of financial group KBC, to acquire 100% direct interest in Raiffeisenbank Bulgaria and indirect control of the target company's wholly-owned units Raiffeisen Leasing Bulgaria, Raiffeisen Asset Management (Bulgaria), Raiffeisen Insurance Broker, and Raiffeisen Service.  The transaction was completed on 7th of July 2022 and marked the exit of Raiffeisen from the Bulgarian market.

Serbia
In August 2021, Crédit Agricole S.A. announced the signing of an agreement to sell Crédit Agricole Srbija A.D. to Raiffeisen banka A.D., Serbia, a fully-owned subsidiary of Austrian Raiffeisen Bank International AG. In accordance with the prior consent of the National Bank of Serbia, Raiffeisen banka a.d Beograd has become the sole owner of Credit Agricole banka Srbija a.d. Novi Sad on April 1st, 2022, taking over from Credit Agricole s.a. Paris as the former owner. As a result of the transaction, Credit Agricole bankа Srbija has become a member of the Raiffeisen group. The joint share of the two banks in the Serbian market will be around 12%. After the merger with Crédit Agricole bank, the loan portfolio of Raiffeisen banka is expected to reach almost € 3 billion and the client base to exceed one million. The merger of Raiffeisen banka a.d. Beograd and Crédit Agricole Srbija A.D. Novi Sad is expected to be completed by the end of the second quarter of 2023.

See also

 Crédit Agricole S.A., French counterpart of French co-operative banks
 ICCREA Banca S.p.A., Italian counterpart of Italian co-operative banks
 Banque Raiffeisen, Luxembourgish counterpart of co-operative banks
 Rabobank, Dutch counterpart of co-operative banks

References

External links
 
Vienna Stock Exchange: Market Data Raiffeisen Bank International AG

 
Companies based in Vienna
Banks established in 1927
Austrian brands
Companies listed on the Wiener Börse
Multinational companies headquartered in Austria